My Mother Dreams the Satan's Disciples in New York is a 1998 short film directed by Barbara Schock. It was made as a thesis film for the AFI Conservatory. In 2000, it won an Oscar at the 72nd Academy Awards for Best Live Action Short Film.

Cast
 Helen Stenborg - Marian
 Patricia Dunnock - Paula
 Scott Sowers - Prospect Biker
 Mickey Jones - Head Biker
 Suzanne Cryer - Marika
 Ilia Volokh - Taxi Driver
 Don Gettinger - Paula's Boss
 Steve Bonge - Lead Biker
 Linda Mancini - Woman on Fire Escape
 Paul Gold - Clubhouse Biker #1
 Camille Carida - Girlfriend on Stairs
 John Henry Whitaker - Clubhouse Biker

References

External links

1999 films
1999 short films
Live Action Short Film Academy Award winners
American independent films
American short films
1990s English-language films
1990s American films